Henri Léon Émile Deloge (21 November 1874 in Saint-Mandé – 27 December 1961 in Bourg-la-Reine) was a French middle distance runner who won a silver medal over 1500m in Athletics at the 1900 Summer Olympics in Paris ahead of John Bray. The race was won by Charles Bennett who won the gold medal. He also won the silver medal in the 5000 metres team race for the French distance team.

Deloge also placed fourth in the 800 metres, after winning his semifinal heat with a time of 2:00.6.  A repeat of that time would have won the final, but Deloge placed fourth instead with an unknown time (but one greater than 2:03.0, the silver medalist's time).

References

External links
 

1874 births
1961 deaths
Olympic athletes of France
Athletes (track and field) at the 1900 Summer Olympics
Olympic silver medalists for France
French male middle-distance runners
Medalists at the 1900 Summer Olympics
Olympic silver medalists in athletics (track and field)
19th-century French people
20th-century French people
People from Saint-Mandé
Sportspeople from Val-de-Marne